Čakanovce refers to several villages and municipalities in Slovakia:

Čakanovce, Lučenec District in the Banská Bystrica Region
Čakanovce, Košice-okolie District in the Košice Region